Lin Lie (Chinese: 林烈) is a Chinese superhero originally appearing in web manhua and later American comic books published by Marvel Comics. Created by artist Gunji and writer Shuizhu, Lin first appeared in the Chinese digital series Warrior of the Three Sovereigns (Simplified Chinese: 三皇斗战士) #1 (May 2018) as Sword Master, a descendant of Fu Xi who wields the mystical Sword of Fu Xi. Lin made his American comics debut in War of the Realms: New Agents of Atlas #2 (May 2019), where he joined the Agents of Atlas. After losing his Sword in Death of Doctor Strange: White Fox #1 (December 2021), Lin Lie became the new Iron Fist in Iron Fist vol. 6 #1 (February 2022).

Publication history 
Lin Lie, along with the character Aero were created for the Chinese market in a collaboration between Marvel and NetEase to attract more readership in China and across East Asia.

After debuting in Chinese digital comics in 2018, Sword Master made his American comics debut in War of the Realms: New Agents of Atlas by writer Greg Pak and artist Gang Hyuk Lim before starring in his own solo series, titled Sword Master, written by Pak and illustrated by Ario Anindito. The Sword Master series also featured republications of the Warriors of Three Sovereigns series Lin debuted in, with translations done by Pak. Sword Master would continue to have regular appearances in Agents of Atlas.

In 2022, Lin Lie made his debut as Iron Fist in a five issue miniseries written by Alyssa Wong and illustrated by Michael YG and Sean Chen. The miniseries was followed up with the one-shot A.X.E.: Iron Fist #1 as part of the A.X.E.: Judgment Day crossover event.

Fictional character biography

Warriors of Three Sovereigns
Lin Lie is a college student from Shanghai who receives a mysterious sword from his archaeologist father, who went missing along with Lie's older brother Feng shortly afterwards. One year after his family's disappearance, Lie is attacked by a demon at his apartment after receiving a mysterious red orb contained in a puzzle box. The sword Lie's father entrusted to him moves on its own to save Lie from the demon, which is then destroyed by Ji Shuangshuang, a demon hunter. Shuangshuang reveals that the sword is the Sword of Fu Xi, one of three sacred weapons used by the Yellow Emperor and the clans of the Three Sovereigns to seal the evil god of war Chiyou in the far past. Shuangshuang explains that she and Lie are the descendants of Nü-wa and Fu Xi, respectively, and that the Sword and the red orb containing a piece of Chiyou's soul were removed from one of Chiyou's three tombs, weakening his seal and allowing several of his demon minions to be unleashed around the world. Believing Lie to be too incompetent to protect the orb, Shuangshuang takes it with her. Lie gives chase but is attacked by Baron Mordo, who attempts to take the Sword for himself, but is driven away by Doctor Strange. Strange offers to keep the Sword for safekeeping but relents after Lie explains his lineage and needing the Sword to find his missing father, using his magic to help Lie reunite with Shuangshuang. Together, Lie and Shuangshuang destroy the remaining demons. Lie travels with Shuangshuang and his roommate Ah Cheng to the Nü-wa Clan's headquarters at Gansu, where he is greeted by Shuangshuang's grandmother and the Nü-wa chief Ji Xiangyun. As Lie, his father and brother are the only known descendants of Fu Xi, Xiangyun has Lie trained under Shuangshuang to prepare against Chiyou and his demon army.

Agents of Atlas
Now going by the name Sword Master, Lie begins a superhero career while fighting the forces of Chiyou and searching for his missing family. During the "War of the Realms", Sword Master and several other Asian superheroes are summoned by Brawn's teleporter to Seoul to help the New Agents of Atlas defend Asia from Queen Sindr and her Fire Goblin forces from Muspelheim. Sword Master and the New Agents of Atlas take Sindr and her army in Northern China and later help Captain Marvel defeat her and her remaining forces at the Great Wall of China near Beijing. After Sindr's liege Malekith is defeated, Sword Master joins the Agents of Atlas.

Sword Master runs into his Atlas teammate Shang-Chi in New York City while searching for his father. Noticing the upstart hero's inexperience and recklessness, Shang takes Lie under his wing to improve his skills. The two are reunited with the other Atlas agents when Flushing and other Asian, Pacific and predominantly Asian cities outside of Asia are merged into the portal city of "Pan" Tech by mogul Mike Nguyen of the Big Nguyen Company. Sword Master and Shang-Chi are later confronted by Ares, who attempts to take the Sword of Fu Xi to rescue his kidnaped drakon son Ismenios, who Ares believes was captured by another god. Shang-Chi makes a compromise to Ares: in exchange for Sword Master and Shang-Chi helping him, Ares would help find Lie's missing father. Ares accepts and use Pan Portals to track Ismenios to a temple in Madripoor, where they encounter Davi Naka, the Mother Goddess of Madripoor. Naka reveals that Ismenios attempted to plunder Atlantis's treasure hoard during the absence of its sea serpent guardian, but was caught by Namor. Due to her duty to protect all dragons, Naka rescued Ismenios from Namor's wrath and imprisoned the young drakon in her temple for his protection and to placate the king. Naka further warns the four that despite her efforts, Namor is still outraged over the disappearance of his dragon and implores them to find her.

Sword Master and the Atlas Agents help assist Pan's citizens, including defending the city from invading wyverns and sea serpents and protecting Madripoorean refuges from harassment from the Pan Guard. Suspicious by these evengs, Sword Master joins several of his teammates into infiltrating Nguyen's personal tower, where they discover that the Big Nguyen Company had captured Atlantis' missing dragon and were harvesting her scales to power Pan's portals. Before a decision could be made about releasing the dragon, Namor emerges from the waters off of Pan's coast to reclaim his stolen dragon, kickstarting a war between Pan and Atlantis.

In the "Atlantis Attacks" storyline, Sword Master and the other New Agents of Atlas are summoned by Brawn during his confrontation with Namor. Namor warns the group to return Atlantis' dragon in a day or else face the wrath of Atlantis before retreating. After the skirmish, Sword Master and the other New Agents are introduced to the original Agents of Atlas by Atlas Foundation head Jimmy Woo. When Woo sends Namora, Venus, Aero and Wave to Atlantis for a diplomatic mission, Brawn discretely orders Sword Master and Shang-Chi to spy on Namora, due to her familial ties with Namor. The dragon is eventually released from captivity, but upon arriving home, she unexpectedly goes berserk and attacks the underwater kingdom. Sword Master witnesses the destruction caused by the dragon and Shang-Chi relays to Amadeus that Atlantis' scientists discovered an implant embedded in the dragon's scales to be the source of her behavior and that Namor believes Amadeus to be behind the sabotage, prompting the king to resume his assault on Pan. When Brawn is forcibly transformed into the Hulk and put under Nguyen's control with Sirena tech in a last-ditch effort to destroy Atlantis, Sword Master and Shang-Chi are able to remove the device from Amadeus, freeing him from Nguyen's control and reverting him back into Brawn. When the conflict between Pan and Atlantis is peacefully resolved, Brawn and Shang-Chi leave the team after admonishing Woo for using the team as his pawns, but Sword Master remains with the Agents of Atlas.

During the "King in Black" event, Sword Master initially defends Shanghai from invading symbiote dragons with Aero and the Black Knight, who had been abandoned in Shanghai and separated from his Ebony Blade, but abandons his mission after realizing that the symbiotes were minions of Knull rather than Chiyou, believing the task to be beneath him. Angered by Lie's arrogance, the Sword of Fu Xi abandons him for the Black Knight, which incenses Sword Master as he dismisses the Black Knight as a "psychotic American" unworthy of wielding the Sword. While using the Sword of Fu Xi, the Black Knight succumbs to madness, which prompts the Sword to return to Lie. As Sword Master and the Black Knight fight over the Sword, a symbiote dragon ensnares them with its tendrils, which also mentally connects them to Knull, who expresses his desire for their respective swords and ruthlessly mocks the two for their ignorance of their weapons' true histories. The Sword of Fu Xi uses the opportunity to use its flames to burn the Black Knight's hand, returning to Sword Master and freeing the two from Knull's grasp just as a swarm of symbiote dragons amalgamates into Knull's avatar, taking on a gigantic appearance of Chiyou. Sword Master helps the Black Knight recover the Ebony Blade and two use their respective swords to destroy the avatar with Aero's help.

When the "Death of Doctor Strange" prompts legions of demons to invade parts of the world, Sword Master is sent to Seoul by Woo to assist his teammate White Fox with taking down a demonic kumiho that had been terrorizing the South Korean countryside. While fighting the kumiho, the Sword of Fu Xi is destroyed by the kumiho who then threw Sword Master into a ravine. Although White Fox is able to slay the demon, she, the Agents of Atlas and South Korea's Tiger Division are unable to find Lie, with White Fox recovering only a single shard of the Sword, causing them to presume he died. Due to the Sword of Fu Xi's destruction, the seals on Chiyou's three tombs further weakened, prompting more of his demon minions to attack cities around the world.

Wielding the Iron Fist
Lin Lie miraculously survives and washes ashore to K'un-Lun, where the recently reincarnated dragon Shou-Lao bestows him with his chi, saving Lie's life and making him the new Iron Fist. With several of the Sword's shards embedded in his hands, Lie resolves to find the remaining pieces and reforge the Sword to prevent Chiyou's release. During his hunt for the shards, Lin Lie briefly encounters his predecessor Danny Rand, who had previously given up the Iron Fist, in Flushing and helps him fight off several minions of Chiyou. Unaware of Lie's identity but happy that Shou-Lao chose a new champion, Danny inquires Lie about his background and offers to help him with his training, but Lie rebuffs and summons a portal back to K'un-Lun Lie is later accompanied by Mei Min, a friend he made in K'un-Lun whose family hosts him, during his travels and helps him recover the remaining shards while fighting the demonic forces of Chiyou. Despite being chosen as the new Iron Fist, Lie's ascension is controversial amongst several K'un-Lun citizens as he is not only the third consecutive outsider to become the Iron Fist, he did not go through the required trials to earn Shou-Lou's chi. Due to the shards of the Sword of Fu Xi embedded in his hands, Lie cannot summon the Iron Fist consistently and is left in a constant state of pain, which makes him a target of ridicule and scorn by several detractors, including his rival Yang Yi. After Lie expresses to Min about how unworthy he is as Iron Fist due to his handicap and unwanted status, the Yu-Ti of K'un-Lun, Sparrow, takes Lie under her wing to help him overcome his struggles and regain his confidence. One day during his training, the shards in Lie's hands suddenly begin radiating with burning energy and leaving him writhing in pain, causing Lie to realize that the first tomb of Chiyou had been destroyed An empowered demon minion of Chiyou manages to bypass K'un-Lun's defenses attempts to steal the Sword's remains at Min's home, but Lie injects his arms with them to thwart the demon and uses their extra power to kill him, who reveals with his dying breaths that Lie's brother Feng was the one who destroyed the tomb and that he was waiting for him at the second tomb. Lie takes a portal to the second tomb with Min and Yi but after arriving they encounter Fat Cobra and the Bride of Nine Spiders. Tasked by Rand to track Lie down, the two Immortal Weapons decide to test the new Iron Fist out by fighting him. Severely outmatched and running out of time, Lie flees from the fight to the Nü-wa Clan's headquarters, but is too late to prevent its destruction from Feng and Chiyou's minions. Unable to summon the Iron Fist, Lie is quickly defeated by Feng. Lie rejects Feng's offer to join him, who proceeds to immerse himself with Chioyou's magic to destroy Lie and his allies. Guided by Shou-Lao's spirit, Lie embraces his identities as Sword Master and Iron Fist, allowing him to summon the full power of the Iron Fist and remove the shards from his hands into a restored blade, which Lie uses to wound Feng. When Sparrow arrives with K'un-Lun's warriors, Feng steals her portal to K'un-Lun, where Chiyou's third tomb is located. After the battle, Lie accepts Danny's offer to train him.

During the "Judgement Day" storyline, Lie takes a flight to Seoul to rendezvous with White Fox but is visited midflight by Loki, who reveals that he is in league with Feng. Provoked by Loki's arrogance, the Progenitor casts judgement on the two by having them partake in trials within their minds. During Loki's judgement, Lie rescues him from being pinned down by a vision of Mjolnir by using the aura from the Sword of Fu Xi to lift it. During Lie's judgement, the Progenitor appears as Shou-Lou and challenges Lie to take his heart to officially earn his title as Iron Fist. Lie is able to defeat Shou-Lou with Loki's help but instead of taking the dragon's heart, Lie asks Shou-Lou to give it to him. Lie receives the mark of the Iron Fist on his right arm and passes the Progenitor's judgement. Lie and Loki find themselves back on the flight as if nothing happened but the mark still remains on Lie's arm. Before Lie could demand Loki to take him to Feng in K'un-Lun, Loki teleports away from him. Lie eventually arrives in Seoul and reunites with White Fox.

Powers and abilities
As the descendant of Fu Xi, Lin Lie can wield the Sword of Fu Xi and access its divine powers. When activated, the Sword generates mystical green flames, which can be launched as projectiles or be used to increase the cutting power and range of the blade. Due to its ability to move on its own, the Sword is capable of allowing Lin to fly at short distances. Although originally forged to destroy Chiyou and his demon minions, the Sword of Fu Xi is shown to be just as effective against other demons and undead.

A noticeable trait is that the Sword of Fu Xi is sentient, and has the ability to move on its own. While the Sword has gone out of its way to protect Lin from threats, it has also defied him when he showed undesirable traits, such as cowardice or arrogance. In some extreme cases, allowed itself to be wielded by non descendants of Fu Xi.

Despite the Sword being shattered, its broken shards can still project its mystical green flames, which are still effective against Chiyou's minions. Lin makes use of the shards embedded in his hands to enhance his punches and infuse weapons with the Sword's flames. Lin later gains the ability to generate blades of the Sword that protrude from his right fist. 

After being bestowed with the chi of the dragon Shou-Lao the Undying, Lin gained the power of the Iron Fist, allowing him to summon and focus his chi to enhance his natural abilities to extraordinary levels. Like every Iron Fist before him, Lin can concentrate his own chi and the superhuman energy from Shou-Lao's heart into his hands, which manifests into a supernatural glow around his hands and fists that can strike with superhuman hardness and impact, while keeping them impervious to pain and injury. Lin can focus his chi inward to heal himself from injury and pain.

Due to the broken shards of the Sword of Fu Xi embedded in the flesh of his hands, Lin Lie is in a constant state of pain and agony. The shards' energy disrupts the flow of his chi, which prevents him from channeling the Iron Fist consistently and causes his body to leak spiritual energy. Failure to balance his chi and harness Shou-Lao's chi can potentially result in Lin's death and immediate removal of the shards are potentially fatal. After overcoming his self-doubt and embracing his dual identities, Lie is able to overcome his weaknesses, allowing him to summon the full power of Shou-Lao and the Sword of Fu Xi simultaneously without any ill effects.

Due to his training under the Nü-wa Clan, Agents of Atlas and the monks of K'un-Lun, Lin Lie is an expert swordsman, martial artist and acrobat. In addition to K'un-Lun's martial arts, Lin is proficient in Bajiquan and Wing Chun.

Lin Lie is also exceptionally good at solving puzzles.

In other media
Lin Lie as Sword Master appears as an unlockable playable character in Marvel Future Fight.

References

External links
Marvel pages: SM2019

Chinese superheroes
 
Fictional dragonslayers
Fictional swordfighters in comics
Marvel Comics characters with superhuman strength
Marvel Comics martial artists
Vigilante characters in comics